The Royal Navy Submarine Service is one of the five fighting arms of the Royal Navy.  It is sometimes known as the Silent Service, as submarines are generally required to operate undetected.

All of these submarines are nuclear powered.

Since 1993 the post of Flag Officer Submarines has been dual-hatted with the post of Commander Operations.

It moved from Dolphin to the Northwood Headquarters in 1978.

History

In 1900 the Royal Navy ordered five submarines from Vickers Shipbuilding and Engineering of Barrow-in-Furness, designed by Electric Boat Company. The following year the first submarine, was launched, and the navy recruited six officers for the Submarine Service, under Reginald Bacon as Inspecting Captain of Submarines. At the beginning of World War I it consisted of 168 officers, 1250 ratings, and 62 submarines.

In the Mediterranean (during the Siege of Malta), British U-class submarines began operations against Italy as early as January 1941. Larger submarines began operations in 1940, but after 50% losses per mission, they were withdrawn. U-class submarines operated from the Manoel Island Base known as HMS Talbot. Unfortunately no bomb-proof pens were available as the building project had been scrapped before the war, owing to cost-cutting policies. The new force was named the Tenth Submarine Flotilla and was placed under Flag Officer Submarines, Admiral Max Horton, who appointed Commander George Simpson to command the unit. Administratively, the Tenth Flotilla operated under the First Submarine Flotilla at Alexandria, itself under the admiral commanding in the Mediterranean, Andrew Cunningham. In reality, Cunningham gave Simpson and his unit a free hand. Until U-class vessels could be made available in numbers, British T-class submarines were used. They had successes, but suffered heavy losses when they began operations on 20 September 1940. Owing to the shortage of torpedoes, enemy ships could not be attacked unless the target in question was a warship, tanker or other "significant vessel". The flotilla's performance of the fleet was mixed at first. They sank  of Italian shipping; half by one vessel, the submarine . It accounted for one Italian submarine, nine merchant vessels and one Motor Torpedo Boat (MTB). The loss of nine submarines and their trained crews and commanders was serious. Most of the losses were to mines. On 14 January 1941, U-class submarines arrived, and the submarine offensive began in earnest.

In her 16-month operational career in the Mediterranean, before she was sunk in April 1942, Upholder carried out 24 patrols and sank around 119,000 tons of Axis ships – 3 U-boats, a destroyer, 15 transport ships with possibly a cruiser and another destroyer also sunk.

On 8 September 1944, C-in-C Mediterranean ordered that the submarine base at La Maddalena be closed, and that Tenth Flotilla be disestablished and the submarines be incorporated into the First Submarine Flotilla at Malta.

Cold War 
The submarine force was cut back after the end of the war. The first British nuclear-powered submarine,  was launched in 1960, based around a U.S.-built nuclear reactor. The UK's strategic nuclear deterrent was transferred to the Royal Navy from the Royal Air Force at midnight on 30 June 1968, i.e. 1 July. The  ballistic missile submarines (SSBNs) were introduced to carry out this role under the Polaris programme from 1968. These carried US-built UGM-27 Polaris A-3 missiles and were later replaced by the  submarines and the Trident missile system from 1994.

In 1978 the Flag Officer Submarines double-hatted as NATO Commander Submarine Force Eastern Atlantic (COMSUBEASTLANT) part of Allied Command Atlantic, moved from HMS Dolphin at Gosport to the Northwood Headquarters.

HMS Splendid and HMS Spartan hunted the Argentine Navy carrier group Task Group 79.1 but did not engage.

At the end of the Cold War in 1989 the Flag Officer Submarines, who was also COMSUBEASTLANT, a rear admiral, who , commanded a fleet of 30 submarines, which were grouped into four squadrons (First, Second, Third, and Tenth (SSBN)) at three bases.

Post Cold War 

In May 1991 s  and her sister  returned to the submarine base  in Gosport from patrol in the Persian Gulf flying Jolly Rogers, indicating successful actions.

In 1999  participated in the Kosovo Conflict and became the first Royal Navy submarine to fire a Tomahawk cruise missile in anger.

During Operation Veritas, the attack on Al-Qaeda and Taliban forces following the September 11 attacks in the United States, was the first Royal Navy submarine to launch Tomahawk cruise missiles against targets in Afghanistan.  was also involved in the initial strikes.  launched fourteen Tomahawks during the 2003 invasion of Iraq.

In 2011, HMS Triumph and Turbulent participated in Operation Ellamy. They launched Tomahawk cruise missiles at targets in Libya, firing the first shots of the operation.

In April 2016, The Sunday Times reported that Royal Navy submarines were to resume under-ice operations in the Arctic. Such operations have not taken place since 2007 after a fatal explosion on board . The crews of all seven active Royal Navy attack submarines will receive training on how to navigate below and "punch through" ice floes.

As of 2018, there had been three near misses between submerged Royal Navy submarines and civilian vessels due to "an insufficient appreciation of the location of surface ships in the vicinity", according to a Marine Accident Investigation Branch report.

Perisher

'Perisher' (as the Submarine Command Course is better known) is a 24-week course all officers must take prior to serving as an executive officer on board a Royal Navy submarine.  It has been run twice a year since 1917, usually starting on 2 July and 14 November each year.  It is widely regarded as one of the toughest command courses in the world, with a historical failure rate of 25%.

If at any point during the training a candidate is withdrawn from training they will be nominated for boat transfer and kept occupied until the transfer. Their bag is packed for them and they are notified of the failure when the boat arrives.  On departure they are presented with a bottle of whisky.  A failure on Perisher means that the unsuccessful candidate is not permitted to return to sea as a member of the Submarine Service (although they are still allowed to wear the dolphin badge). They are, however, permitted to remain in the Royal Navy, moving into the surface fleet.

In more recent years, the United States Navy has sent some of its own submariner officers to undergo the 'Perisher', in order to foster and maintain closer links with the Royal Navy.

In 1995 the Royal Netherlands Navy took over the Perisher course for diesel-electric submarines, since the Royal Navy no longer operates boats of that type. The course is attended by candidate submarine commanders from navies around the world.

Traditions

The Submarine Service has many traditions that are not found in the surface fleet. These include slang unique to submariners (such as referring to the torpedo storage compartment as the Bomb Shop and the diesel engine room as the Donk Shop), a special communications code known as the Dolphin Code and the entitlement of a sailor to wear Dolphins and black cap covers upon entering the service. These are only awarded after completion of training and qualification in ships' systems during the first submarine posting (Part III training).

The Jolly Roger and the Submarine Service

Rear-Admiral Arthur Wilson VC, the Controller of the Royal Navy, has gone down in history as the officer who claimed in 1901 "[Submarines are] underhand, unfair, and damned un-English. ... treat all submarines as pirates in wartime ... and hang all crews," In fact he had advocated the purchase of submarines the year before, and he was actually expressing a desire to continue the policy of discouraging foreign powers from building submarines while the Royal Navy developed its own in secret. The legend goes that in response to these top secret remarks of Wilson's made 13 years earlier Lieutenant-Commander (later Admiral Sir) Max Horton first flew the Jolly Roger on return to port after sinking the German cruiser  and the destroyer  in 1914 while in command of the E-class submarine .

In World War II it became common practice for the submarines of the Royal Navy to fly the Jolly Roger on completion of a successful combat mission where some action had taken place, but as an indicator of bravado and stealth rather than of lawlessness. For example, in 1982 returning from the Falklands conflict  flew the Jolly Roger depicting one dagger for the SBS deployment to South Georgia and one torpedo for her sinking of the Argentinian cruiser General Belgrano. The Jolly Roger is now the emblem of the Royal Navy Submarine Service.

Dolphins Badge 
First officially adopted in the 1950s, qualified submariners are presented the Golden Dolphins badge to wear on their uniform on the left breast above any medals. The current badge, adopted in 1972, depicts two golden dolphins facing an anchor surmounted by St Edwards Crown. In September 2020, it was announced that all trainee submariners would be issued their own dolphins badge; similar to the Golden Dolphins in size and shape, though completely black.

Active submarines

The Submarine Service consists of two classes of Fleet submarines and one class of Ballistic Missile submarines.

Fleet submarines

There are six fleet submarines in commission – one  and five . They are all nuclear submarines and are classified as SSNs.

These submarines are armed with the Spearfish torpedo for anti-submarine and anti-surface warfare. They have the ability to fire Tomahawk cruise missiles for attacking targets on land. This capability was used by  against the Taliban in 2001 during Operation Veritas. The Fleet submarines are also capable of surveillance and reconnaissance missions. Fleet submarines are sometimes referred to as attack or hunter-killer vessels.

Ballistic submarines

They were all built by Vickers Shipbuilding and Engineering Ltd., now BAE Systems Submarine Solutions. The SSBN flotilla or bomber 'fleet' tends to be almost a separate entity; for example, it rarely uses pennant numbers preferring to use hull numbers, thus Vanguard 05, Victorious 06, Vigilant 07 and Vengeance 08.

The four Vanguard class boats are responsible for the United Kingdom's nuclear deterrent, and use the Trident missile system.  Each boat can carry up to 16 Trident II D5 Missiles, each of which may carry up to 12 nuclear warheads. As of 2022 it is UK Government policy to refrain from declaring current stockpiles, deployed warheads and deployed missile numbers.
There has been at least one SSBN on patrol at all times since April 1969.

Rescue systems
The Royal Navy operated the LR5 Submarine Rescue System, designed for retrieving sailors from stranded submarines. Capable of rescuing up to 16 sailors at a time, the system was deployed to the wreck site of the sunken . The system was replaced in 2004 with the NATO Submarine Rescue System which remains based in the UK.

The Royal Navy, along with France and Norway, is part of the NATO Submarine Rescue System.

Decommissioning nuclear submarines

Twenty-one nuclear submarines awaiting decommissioning have been laid-up at Rosyth and Devonport. In 2014 the MOD announced a plan to decommission 7 of the submarines awaiting disposal, in a project expected to take 12 years. A site for the intermediate-level nuclear waste produced is expected to be identified by 2016. A trial dismantling of a nuclear submarine is planned to start in January 2016 at Rosyth.

In 2018, the UK Parliament's Public Accounts Committee criticised the slow rate of decommissioning of these submarines, with the Ministry of Defence admitting that it had put off decommissioning due to the cost. The National Audit Office in 2019 stated that the accumulative costs of laid up storage had reached £500 million, and they represent a liability of £7.5 billion.

in 2019 it has been acknowledged that the UK has more obsolete submarines than they have in service, a problem that has been ignored for over 50 years as the UK do not currently have a clear funding plan for defuelling and dismantling of these submarines. The US have been decommissioning nuclear submarines for many years in a programme that is self funding by recycling many of the components. It's possible that their expertise in decommissioning could be leverage in securing submarine building contracts from the UK.

Future submarines

A total force of seven  fleet submarines is planned. As of August 2022, the first five boats are in commission and in service, while boats six and seven are in various stages of construction. Boat number seven was confirmed in the October 2010 Strategic Defence and Security Review and long-lead items have been ordered. The Astute-class submarine is the largest nuclear fleet submarine ever to serve with the Royal Navy, being nearly 30% larger than its predecessors. Its powerplant is the Rolls-Royce PWR2 reactor, developed for the Vanguard-class SSBN. The submarine's armament consists of up to 38 Spearfish torpedoes and Tomahawk Block IV land-attack cruise missiles.

The replacement class for the  SSBNs was ordered in 2016 and is named the  after its lead boat. The programme will seek to replace one-for-one the current four ballistic missile submarines starting sometime during the early 2030s. There is also a plan for a Maritime Underwater Future Capability (MUFC), that is, a successor to the Astute-class SSN. MUFC is also known as the 'Astute Replacement Nuclear Submarine (SSN (R))'.

See also

 List of submarine classes of the Royal Navy
 List of submarines of the Royal Navy
 Royal Navy Submarine Museum

References

Bibliography

Further reading

External links 
 

1901 establishments in the United Kingdom
S
 
Submarine services